Jorge Raúl Porcel de Peralta (7 September 1936 – 16 May 2006), known as Jorge Porcel, was an Argentine comedy actor and television host. He was nicknamed El Gordo de América (America's Fat Guy). Porcel is considered, along with Alberto Olmedo, one of Argentina's greatest comic actors of the twentieth century.

Film career 
Porcel worked in 49 movies, starting with 1962's Disloque en Mar del Plata, and ending with Carlito's Way (1993). Many of these 49 movies were collaborations with Olmedo. Among the movies they did together was 1986's Rambito y Rambón: Primera Misión. (Little Rambo and Big Rambo: First Mission)

Many of Porcel and Olmedo's movies in the 1970s and 1980s were adult-oriented comedies. Conservative Argentine authorities rated these movies as PM-18 (age 18 and above), except for some movies planned for family audiences, which had "tamer" content. These movies are considered to be the pinnacle of Argentina's sexy comedy movie genre. Most of these movies were directed by Gerardo Sofovich or his brother Hugo. Porcel virtually stopped appearing in these movies after the accidental death of Olmedo, which left him clinically depressed.

Films

Television career 

Porcel had many TV hit shows as well, including Operación Ja Ja (both the 1960s original and the 1980s remake) and Polémica en el bar (Debate at the Café), where he had celebrated moments of comedy with fellow comedian Juan Carlos Altavista. Most of these TV efforts were linked to the Sofovich brothers. He also did Las Gatitas Y Ratones de Porcel (Little Cats & Mice of Porcel).

After he retired from filming movies in Argentina, he moved to Miami, where he starred in a risqué late-night variety show named A la cama con Porcel (To Bed with Porcel) on the Telemundo network, and was given a cameo in Hollywood production Carlito's Way. A La Pasta con Porcel is a restaurant in Miami Beach opened by Porcel and named after his popular television show.

Porcel's health deteriorated with time, due to his struggles with obesity and diabetes, to the point of ending up using a wheelchair in his later years. He toured during 1999 through Latin America to promote his autobiography Laughs, Applause and Tears. By this time, he had also become a born again Christian.

Porcel died in a hospital in Miami after a gallbladder surgery at the age of 69. His body was flown to Argentina and buried at the Chacarita Cemetery.

Music 
In 1980 he recorded a bolero record called Pure heart (Spanish: Puro Corazón (1980)) . Jorge Porcel loved music and in his shows he used to sing boleros, as in Las gatitas y ratones de Porcel (Porcel's kittens and mice) (where he was frequently accompanied by piano player Mike Rivas) and at ¿Lo viste a Porcel? (Have you seen Porcel). With his character Don Mateo he took part in a record from the show Operacióm Ja-Já (Operation Ha ha) singing along with Rolo Puente, Leo Dan's hit «Libre, solterito y sin nadie» (Free, single and with nobody).

Comics 
In 1970's decade, for several years, Cielosur Editora published several magazines dedicated to TV characters, as Piluso, Minguito and El Gordo Porcel. Las aventuras del Gordo Porcel (The adventures of Porcel the Fat Man) was the title of the one dedicated to Jorge. The usual play -with drawings by Francisco Mazza- consisted of el Gordo getting in trouble and several confusions, during the time in between the feasts of food prepared by his mother, who he lived with. Other frequent characters are his girlfriend and his dog Banana, who had his own comic.

See also 

Argentine humour
List of television presenters/Argentina

References

External links 
 
 
 
 

1936 births
Male actors from Buenos Aires
Argentine male film actors
Argentine male television actors
Argentine comedians
Argentine evangelicals
2006 deaths
Burials at La Chacarita Cemetery
20th-century comedians